ANOM can stand for:

 Archives nationales d'outre-mer, a branch of the Archives Nationales of France
 ANOM sting operation, a transnational law enforcement sting operation revealed in 2021